Victoria Tatiana Desintonio Malavé (born 1988) is an Ecuadorian politician. She was elected to the seven-member Council for Citizen Participation and Social Control by popular vote and she was later removed. She then became a member of Ecuador's National Assembly. She is a member of the political coalition Union for Hope (Unión por la Esperanza) and she campaigns for women's rights.

Life 
Desintonio was born in 1988. When she was seventeen she joined the international Jubilee 2000 movement that had campaigned to cut debt in developing countries by the end of the millennium.  In 2011 and 2012, she was working as an analyst. She is from Guayaquil and trained as a lawyer at the University of Guayaquil.

Desintonio was elected to join the seven-member Council for Citizen Participation and Social Control (CCPSC) for four years in 2019. This body's activities includes the recognition of 150 national heroes. The six other members elected were María Fernanda Rivadeneira, Sofía Almeida, Rosa Chalá, José Carlos Tuárez, Walter Gómez and Christian Cruz. The announcement in May 2019 had taken 54 days, and six candidates had been excluded. She campaigns for women's rights, and she proposed additions to the law to create a "citizen observatory" watchdog to reduce gender violence; her proposals were accepted. This watchdog was described as the "Citizen Observatory for the Application, Implementation and Effective Compliance of the Comprehensive Organic Law for the Prevention and Eradication of Gender Violence against Women". Desintonio proposed that she would run this watchdog but the CCPSC decided that it would be handled by the whole council.

Desintonio was removed from the seven-member council with three others in August 2019. Each was allowed to defend their position and Desintonio took an hour and a quarter in which she noted that it had been agreed that council members would be elected by popular vote and now the National Assembly was interfering with elected members. The National Assembly concluded that members of the CPCCS had behaved unconstitutionally and they had the four members removed. After a vote in which 84 members voted in favour, José Tuárez, Rosa Chalá, Walter Gómez, and Desintonio were censured and dismissed from the council. Desintonio was later elected to the 137 strong National Assembly as a member of the political coalition Union for Hope (Unión por la Esperanza). Over 40% of the assembly's members are women.

She was made the Vice President of the Commission on Constitutional Guarantees, Human Rights, Collective Rights and Interculturality under Joseph Cabascango as President. The other members of the commission include Paola Castillo, Sofía Sánchez, Fernanda Astudillo and Guadalupe Llori.

A fellow politician, Bella Jimenez, was brought to account to the National Assembly's Ethics Committee by Alejandro Jaramillo and Desintonio. She was accused of and later found to have taken money from her prospective team members in order that they could work for her. She was dismissed from the assembly.

Private life 
Desintonio is married and has two children.

References 

1980s births
Members of the National Assembly (Ecuador)
Women members of the National Assembly (Ecuador)
21st-century Ecuadorian women politicians
21st-century Ecuadorian politicians
Living people
University of Guayaquil alumni
Women's rights activists